Eutrichapion is a genus of pear-shaped weevils in the family of beetles known as Brentidae. There are about eight described species in Eutrichapion.

Species
These eight species belong to the genus Eutrichapion:
 Eutrichapion cavifrons (LeConte, 1857) g b
 Eutrichapion gribodoi (Desbrochers, 1896) g
 Eutrichapion huron (Fall, 1898) g b
 Eutrichapion hydropicum (Wencker, 1864) g
 Eutrichapion mystriophorum Alonso-Zarazaga, 1994 g
 Eutrichapion punctiger (Paykull, 1792) g
 Eutrichapion rhomboidale (Desbrochers, 1870) g
 Eutrichapion viciae (Paykull, 1800) g b
Data sources: i = ITIS, c = Catalogue of Life, g = GBIF, b = Bugguide.net

References

Further reading

External links

 

Brentidae